Mordellistena escisa is a beetle in the genus Mordellistena of the family Mordellidae. It was described in 1928 by Scegoleva-Barovskaja.

References

escisa
Beetles described in 1928